Daniel Levy (born 1962) is a German–American political sociologist and an Associate Professor of Sociology at the State University of New York at Stony Brook. Levy earned a Bachelor of Arts in sociology and political science (1986) and a Master of Arts in sociology (1990) from Tel Aviv University, as well as a Doctorate of sociology from Columbia University in 1999. He is a specialist on issues relating to globalization, collective memory studies, and comparative historical sociology.  Levy, along with the historians Paul Gootenberg and Herman Lebovics, is a founder and organizer of the Initiative for Historical Social Science, a program that is run out of Stony Brook with the goal of promoting the "New Historical Social Sciences". He also, along with the Human Rights scholar and historian Elazar Barkan, is the founder of the "History, Redress, and Reconciliation" Seminar series at Columbia University. The seminars are an attempt to provide "a forum for interdisciplinary work on issues at the intersection of history, memory, and contemporary politics" focusing particularly on the "redressing [of] past wrongs and gross violations of human rights."

Levy serves on the editorial boards of the American Sociological Association's Rose Series in Sociology, the European Journal of Social Theory, and for Memory Studies.

Works

Books 
Challenging Ethnic Citizenship: German and Israeli Perspectives on Immigration (ed.) (New York: Berghahn Books, 2002) with Yfaat Weiss
Memory and the Holocaust in a Global Age (Philadelphia: Temple University Press, 2006) with Natan Sznaider
Old Europe, New Europe, Core Europe: Transatlantic Relations After the Iraq War (ed.) (London: Verso Books, 2005) with Max Pensky and John Torpey
Human Rights and Memory (Pennsylvania State University Press, 2010) with Natan Sznaider. .
The Collective Memory Reader (Oxford University Press, 2011) with Jeffrey K. Olick and Vered  Vinitzky-Seroussi. .

Book chapters 
"Coming Home? Ethnic Germans and the Transformation of National Identity in the Federal Republic of Germany" in Geddes, Andrew and Adrian Favell Immigration and the Politics of Belonging in Contemporary Europe. (Aldershot: Ashgate Pub., 1999)
"Refugees, Expellees, and Aussiedler in the Federal Republic of Germany: Social, Political, and Legal Dimensions of the Integration Process" in Rock, David and Stefan Wolff (eds.) Coming Home to Germany? The Integration of Ethnic Germans from Central and Eastern Europe in the Federal Republic. (Oxford, Berghahn Books, 2002)
"The Transformation of Germany's Ethno-Cultural Idiom: The Case of Ethnic German Immigrants"  in Levy, Daniel and Yfaat Weiss Challenging Ethnic Citizenship: German and Israeli Perspectives on Immigration. (New York: Berghahn Books, 2002)
"Institutionalizing the Past: Shifting Memories of Nationhood in German Education and Immigration Legislation" with Julian Dierkes in Mueller, Jan Werner (ed.) Memory and Power in International Relations. (Cambridge, Cambridge University Press, 2003)
"The Politicization of Ethnic German Immigrants: The Transformation of State Priorities" in Münz, Rainer and Rainer Ohliger (eds.) (London: Frank Cass Pub., 2003)
"The Cosmopolitan Figuration: Historicizing Reflexive Modernization" in Poferl, Angelika and Natan Sznaider (eds.) Ulrich Beck's kosmopolitisches Projekt. (Baden-Baden: Nomos Verlagsgesellschaft, 2004)
"Holocaust and Social Theory" with Natan Sznaider in Ritzer, George (ed.) Encyclopedia of Social Theory. (New York: Sage, 2004)
"Forgive and Not Forget: Reconciliation Between Forgiveness and Resentment" with Natan Sznaider in Barkan, Elazar and Alexander Karn (eds.) Taking Wrongs Seriously: Apologies and Reconciliation. (Palo Alto: Stanford University Press, 2005)
"The Politics of Commemoration: The Holocaust, Memory, and Trauma" with Natan Sznaider in Delanty, Gerard (ed.) Handbook of Contemporary European Social Theory. (New York: Routledge, 2005)
"Memories of Europe: Cosmopolitanism and its Others" with Natan Sznaider in Rumford, Chris (ed.) Cosmopolitanism in Europe. (Liverpool: Liverpool University Press, 2007)
“Vom Holocaust zur kosmopolitischen Erinnerungskultur” with Natan Sznaider in Beck, Ulrich (ed.) Generation Global. (Frankfurt: Suhrkamp, 2007)
"The Cosmopolitanization of Holocaust Memory: From Jewish to Human Experience" with Natan Sznaider in Gerson, Judith M. and Wolf, Diane L. (eds.) Sociology Confronts the Holocaust. (Duke University Press, 2007)
"Cosmopolitanization of Memory: The Politics of Forgiveness and Restitution" with Natan Sznaider and Ulrich Beck in Nowicka, Magdalena and Maria Rovisco (eds.) Cosmopolitanism in Practice. (Aldershot: Ashgate Publishing, 2009)

Articles 
"Computers and Class: Computers and Social Inequality in Israeli Schools". (1991). Urban Education. 25 (4): 483–499, with David Navon and Rina Shapira.
"The Intifadah in 'Mabat'". (1992). Politics, Media and Society. 1 (1): 9–30.
"Mechanisms of Cultural Constraint: Holocaust Myth and Rationality in German Politics". (1997). American Sociological Review. 62: 921–936, with Jeffrey K. Olick.
"Historical Memory and the Reconfiguration of Collective Boundaries". (1999). Passato e Presente. 47: 31–42.
"The Future of the Past: Historiographical Disputes and Competing Memories in Germany and Israel". (1999). History and Theory. 38 (1): 51–66.
"Memory Unbound: The Holocaust and the Formation of Cosmopolitan Memory". (2002). European Journal of Social Theory. 5 (1): 87–106, with Natan Sznaider.
"The Institutionalization of Cosmopolitan Morality: The Holocaust and Human Rights". (2004). Journal of Human Rights. 3 (2): 143–157, with Natan Sznaider.
"Memories of Universal Victimhood: The Case of Ethnic German Expellees". (2005). German Politics and Society. 23 (2): 1–27., with Natan Sznaider.
“Kosmopolitische Erinnerung und reflexive Modernisierung: Der politische Diskurs der Zwangsarbeitsentschädigung”. (2005). Soziale Welt. 56 (2): 225–246, with Natan Sznaider and Michael Heinlein.
"The Transformation of Sovereignty: Towards a Sociology of Human Rights". (2006). British Journal of Sociology. 57 (4): 657–676., with Natan Sznaider.
"Recursive Cosmopolitanization: Argentina and the Global Human Rights Regime". (2010). British Journal of Sociology. 61 (3): 579–596.
"Reflexive Particularism and Cosmopolitanization: The Reconfiguration of the National". (2011). Global Networks. 11 (2): 139–159, with Michael Heinlein and Lars Breuer.

Book reviews 
The Israeli Diaspora by Steven J. Gold. (2005). International Migration Review. 38: 789.
Germans or Foreigners? Attitudes Towards Ethnic Minorities in Post–Reunification Germany edited by Richard D. Alba, Peter Schmidt, and Martina Wasmer. (2005). H-Net German.
Memories of State: Politics, History, and Collective Identity in Modern Iraq by Eric Davis. (2006). Contemporary Sociology. 35 (1): 62–63.
Contested Citizenship: Immigration and Cultural Diversity in Europe by Ruud Koopmans, Marco Giugni, and Florence Passy. (2007). Social Forces. 86 (1): 373–375.
Civil Society: Berlin Perspectives edited by John Keane. (2007). H-Net German.
After the Nazi Racial State: Difference and Democracy in Germany and Europe by Rita Chin, Heide Fehrenbach, Geoff Eley, and Atina Grossmann. (2011). H-Net German.

Notes

External links
 State University of New York at Stony Brook Sociology Department Homepage

American sociologists
Columbia Graduate School of Arts and Sciences alumni
German emigrants to the United States
German sociologists
Rockefeller Fellows
Sociology educators
Stony Brook University faculty
Tel Aviv University alumni
1962 births
Living people
German male writers